Margarita Goncharova (née Koptilova ; born March 14, 1991, in Volsk, Saratov oblast) is a Paralympian athlete from Russia competing mainly in category T38 sprint events. She competed in the 2008 Summer Paralympics in Beijing, China.  There she won a bronze medal in the women's 100 metres - T38 event and a bronze medal in the women's 200 metres - T38 event.

External links
 

Paralympic athletes of Russia
Athletes (track and field) at the 2008 Summer Paralympics
Paralympic bronze medalists for Russia
1991 births
Living people
Paralympic silver medalists for Russia
Paralympic gold medalists for Russia
Medalists at the 2008 Summer Paralympics
Medalists at the 2012 Summer Paralympics
Athletes (track and field) at the 2012 Summer Paralympics
World Para Athletics Championships winners
Medalists at the World Para Athletics European Championships
Paralympic medalists in athletics (track and field)
Athletes (track and field) at the 2020 Summer Paralympics
Paralympic silver medalists for the Russian Paralympic Committee athletes
People from Volsk
Sportspeople from Saratov Oblast